Samrat or Samraat may refer to:

Film
Samrat (1954 film), a Bollywood film directed by Najam Naqvi
Samraat (film), a 1982 Indian Hindi-language film directed by Mohan Segal
Samrat (1994 film), an Indian Kannada-language film directed by Naganna
Samrat (1997 film), an Indian Tamil-language film directed by Sakthi Chidambaram (as C. Dinakaran)

Other uses
Samrat (name), a given name and surname
Emperor, in Sanskrit samraat or samrat
ICGS Samrat, an Indian Coast Guard advanced offshore patrol vessel

See also 
 Sarmat (disambiguation)
 King of All Kings (disambiguation), literal translation of samrat